Eamonn Toal represented Ireland in the Eurovision Song Contest 2000 in Stockholm with the song "Millennium of Love".

Before Eurovision

Eurosong 2000 
Eurosong 2000 was the national final format developed by RTÉ in order to select Ireland's entry for the Eurovision Song Contest 2000. The competition was held at the RTÉ Television Centre in Dublin on 20 February 2000 and hosted by Mary Kennedy who previously presented the 1995 Eurovision Song Contest. Eight artists and songs were selected to compete and regional televoting determined the winner. After the combination of votes, "Millennium of Love" performed by Eamonn Toal was selected as the winner.

At Eurovision 
Toal performed 23rd in the running order on the night of the contest, following Turkey and preceding Austria. At the close of voting, "Millennium of Love" received 92 points, finishing 6th out of 24 countries. The Irish televoting awarded its 12 points to the contest winners Denmark.

Voting

References

2000
Countries in the Eurovision Song Contest 2000
Eurovision
Eurovision